Vexillum albolineatum is a species of small sea snail, marine gastropod mollusk in the family Costellariidae, the ribbed miters.

Description
The length of the shell attains 14 mm.
{çExpand section|date=March 2023}}

Distribution
This marine species occurs off Western Australia.

References

albolineatum
Gastropods described in 2007
Gastropods of Australia